Paraglycia is a genus of beetles in the family Carabidae, containing the following species:

 Paraglycia castanea (Boheman, 1848)
 Paraglycia cyanochloris Felix & Mulwijk, 2009
 Paraglycia obscuripennis Fairmaire, 1886
 Paraglycia picea (Boheman, 1848)
 Paraglycia rufula (Gory, 1833)
 Paraglycia sulcatula (Fairmaire, 1887)

References

Lebiinae